Wilfred Beauchamp "Billie" Legg (3 November 1906 – 1973) was a South African athlete who competed in the 1928 Summer Olympics.

Legg was born in Robertson, Western Cape. In 1928 he finished fifth the Olympic 100 metres event. In the 200 metres competition he was eliminated in the semi-finals. At the 1930 Empire Games he was a member of the South African relay team which won the bronze medal in the 4×110 yards contest as well as in the 4×440 yards event. In the 100 yards competition he finished fourth and in the 220 yards contest he was eliminated in the heats.

Competition record

External links
 Profile at trackfield.brinkster.net
 Wilfred Legg's profile at Sports Reference.com

1906 births
1973 deaths
People from Robertson, Western Cape
South African male sprinters
Olympic athletes of South Africa
Athletes (track and field) at the 1928 Summer Olympics
Athletes (track and field) at the 1930 British Empire Games
Commonwealth Games bronze medallists for South Africa
Commonwealth Games medallists in athletics
Sportspeople from the Western Cape
20th-century South African people
Medallists at the 1930 British Empire Games